HMS Windsor Castle was a 98-gun second-rate ship of the line of the Royal Navy, launched on 3 May 1790 at Deptford Dockyard.

Dardanelles

Windsor Castle was part of Robert Calder's fleet at the Battle of Cape Finisterre in 1805. She shared in the prize and head money for San Rafael and Firme captured on that day.

On 25 September a French squadron of five frigates and two corvettes under Commodore Eleonore-Jean-Nicolas Soleil was escorting a convoy ferrying supplies and troops to the French West Indies. A British squadron intercepted the convoy, which led to the action of 25 September 1806, where the British captured four of the frigates: Armeide, Minerva, Indefatigable, and Gloire. The frigate  and the corvette  escaped, with  managing to outrun Windsor Castle.

While in the Mediterranean she served during Vice Admiral Sir John Duckworth's unsuccessful 1807 Dardanelles Operation. On 19 February, Windsor Castle suffered seven men wounded while forcing the Dardanelles. Near a redoubt on Point Pesquies the British encountered a Turkish squadron of one ship of 64 guns, four frigates and eight other vessels, most of which they ran aground. Marines from  spiked the 31 guns on the redoubt. On 27 February Windsor Castle had one man killed assisting a Royal Marine landing party on the island of Prota.

On the way out, the Turkish castle at Abydos fired on the British squadron. Windsor Castle was badly damaged when an 800-pound stone shot from a Turkish cannon sheared off her main mast. Windsor Castle had four men killed and 20 wounded in the withdrawal. In all, the British lost 29 killed and 138 wounded. No ship was lost.

Windsor Castle accompanied Duckworth on the Alexandria expedition of 1807, and in May left Alexandria and sailed to Malta.

Fate

She was reduced to a 74-gun ship in 1814, and was eventually broken up in 1839.

Notes

References
Citations

Bibliography

 Howard, Edward (2003) Memoires of Admiral Sir Sidney Smith, K.C. B., & c., Volume 2, Adamant Media Corporation.
 
 Lavery, Brian (2003) The Ship of the Line - Volume 1: The development of the battlefleet 1650-1850. Conway Maritime Press. .
 Yeo, Richard R., The Edinburgh Encyclopaedia, Routledge, 1999.

External links
 

Ships of the line of the Royal Navy
London-class ships of the line
1790 ships